Armenians in Ukraine are ethnic Armenians who live in Ukraine.  They number 99,894 according to the 2001 Ukrainian census.  However, the country is also host to a number of Armenian guest workers which has yet to be ascertained.  The Armenian population in Ukraine has nearly doubled since the dissolution of the Soviet Union in 1989, largely due to instability in the Caucasus. Ukraine is currently home to the 5th largest Armenian community in the world.

Early history

Armenians first appeared in Ukraine during the times of Kievan Rus'. During the 10th century individual Armenian merchants, mercenaries and craftsmen served at the courts of various Ruthenian rulers. A larger wave of Armenians settled in southeastern Ukraine after the fall of the Armenian capital of Ani to Seljuks in the 11th century. They arrived mainly at the Crimean peninsula and established colonies in Kaffa (Feodosiya), Sudak and Solcati (Staryi Krym). Their numbers were further strengthened throughout the 12th–15th century by Armenians fleeing from a Mongol invasion. This gave the peninsula the name Armenia Maritima in medieval chronicles. Smaller Armenian communities were established in central Ukraine, including Kyiv, and the western regions of Podolia and Halychyna, concentrating around Lviv which in 1267 became the center of an Armenian eparchy.

At the end of the thirteenth century, when members of the Armenian diaspora moved from the Crimean peninsula to the Polish-Ukrainian borderland, they brought Armeno-Kipchak, a Turkic language with them. Armeno-Kipchak of the Kipchak people was still current in the 16th and 17th centuries among the Armenian communities settling in the Lviv and Kamianets-Podilskyi area of what is now Ukraine.

After Crimea fell to the Ottoman Turks in 1475 many Crimean Armenians moved further to the north-west to the already flourishing Armenian communities which gradually integrated into the local Polish population while maintaining their distinct identity through the Armenian Catholic Church. In the 18th century Crimea fell under influence of the Russian Empire, which encouraged Crimean Armenians to settle in Russia and a large group of them came to the town of Rostov on Don in 1778, twenty years later Russia having conquered the peninsula called to colonize it and many Armenians arrived from Turkey, establishing new Armenian colonies. During World War II in 1944 Armenians were deported en masse along with Greeks, Bulgarians and Tatars as a "antisoviet element" and allowed to return only in the 1960s. During Soviet rule Armenians came together with people from other Soviet ruled nations to Ukraine to work in the heavy industry located in the eastern parts of the country.

Armenian community in modern Ukraine

Today, the Donetsk Oblast holds the greatest number of Armenians in Ukraine (~16 000, 0.33% of the population). Armenian communities can also be found in Dnipro, Kharkiv, Kherson, Kyiv, Luhansk, Mykolaiv, Zaporizhzhia, and Odessa where the late Ukrainian-Armenian artist Sarkis Ordyan spent most of his life. The city of Lviv is a "spiritual capital" of Armenians in Ukraine serving as an eparchial see for both Catholic and Apostolic churches, under which Ukraine as a single eparchy is split between both of them. Alas, the Armenian Catholic Archeparchy of Lviv is not occupied ever since the end of World War II and the Armenian Apostolic Church is predominant.

The Armenians continue to have a historic presence in Crimea, which remains under Russian control since the 2014 Russian military intervention in Ukraine. The 9,000 Armenians make up 0.43% of the population in the area and are numerous in major urban centers such as Sevastopol where they comprise 0.3% of the city's population.  Hovhannes Aivazovsky, the world-renowned Armenian painter lived and worked his entire life in the Crimean city of Feodosiya.

Many Armenians living in Ukraine have been Russified with about half speaking Armenian as their mother tongue but over 43% speaking Russian and only 6% Ukrainian.

Distribution 
 
 
Armenians in Ukraine by oblasts according to 2001 Ukrainian Census.
 

 
Armenians in Ukraine by cities, according to the 2001 census:

Notable representatives
 Józef Bartłomiej Zimorowic, Polish poet and historian of the Baroque era, burgomaster of Lviv
 Mikołaj Torosowicz, the first Armenian Catholic bishop of Lviv
 Grzegorz Piramowicz, Roman Catholic priest
 Karol Antoniewicz, Polish-Armenian Jesuit and missionary
 Sadok Barącz, Galician religious leader, historian, folklorist, archivist
 Julian Oktawian Zachariewicz-Lwigród, Lviv architect 
 Ignacy Łukasiewicz, Galician pharmacist, engineer, businessman, inventor, and philanthropist
 Dawid Abrahamowicz, Polish politician and social activist
 Adolf Abrahamowicz, Polish writer
 Kajetan Abgarowicz, Polish journalist and writer
 Ivan Aivazovsky (Crimean Armenian), painter
 Józef Teodorowicz, the last Armenian Catholic Archbishop of Lviv
 Tamara Tchinarova (partly Armenian), ballerina
 Sergei Parajanov, filmmaker
 Vagrich Bakhchanyan, graphic artist and designer
 Roman Balayan, film director
 Arsen Savadov, painter
 Vadym Novynskyi, oligarch
 Arsen Avakov (Armenian father, Ossetian mother), Ukrainian Minister of Interior (longest serving minister)
 David Manukyan, Greco Roman wrestler
 Oksana Markarova (partly Armenian), politician and the current Ambassador of Ukraine to the United States, former Minister of Finance
 Armen Akopyan, football player
 Jamala (Crimean Tatar father, Armenian mother), Ukrainian singer (winner of the Eurovision Song Contest)
 Artem Dalakian, boxer
 Armen Vardanyan, Greco-Roman wrestler
 Katerina Rohonyan, Ukrainian-American chess player (Woman Grandmaster)
 Serhiy Nigoyan, Euromaidan activist, first protester killed by shooting during the protest
 Valeriy Voskonyan, football player
 Artur Avahimyan, football player

Cultural heritage
Armenian cultural heritage in Ukraine:

See also
Armenian diaspora
Armenians in Crimea
Armenian Cathedral, Lviv
Ukrainians in Armenia
Armenian-Ukrainian relations
Armenians in Poland
Armenians in Russia
Armenians in Romania

References

External links
Вірмени в Україні 
Kyiv Armenian community

 
Ukraine
Ethnic groups in Ukraine
Armenia–Ukraine relations